David Jewett Baker Jr. (November 20, 1834 – March 13, 1899), the son of David J. Baker, was a justice of the Supreme Court of Illinois.

Born in Kaskaskia, Illinois, Baker received his bachelor's degree from Shurtleff College in 1856. Baker was admitted to the Illinois bar in 1856 and moved to Cairo, Illinois to practice law. Baker served as city attorney and then as mayor of Cairo, Illinois in 1864 and 1865. From 1868 to 1878, Baker served as an Illinois state court judge. In 1878 and 1879 and from 1888 to 1893, Baker served on the Illinois Supreme Court and was chief justice. Baker died suddenly in his law office.

In 1895 Justice Baker issued the decision in Zirngibl et al. v. Calumet & C. Canal & Dock Co. et al. that allowed the grave of Andreas von Zirngibl, located on the property of the dock company, to remain intact; the grave is now surrounded by an operating scrap yard.

Notes

1834 births
1899 deaths
People from Cairo, Illinois
People from Kaskaskia, Illinois
Shurtleff College alumni
Mayors of places in Illinois
Illinois state court judges
Illinois lawyers
Chief Justices of the Illinois Supreme Court
Illinois Republicans
19th-century American judges
19th-century American lawyers
Justices of the Illinois Supreme Court